The 2008 GP Ouest–France cycling road race took place on August 25, 2008, in France and was won by Pierrick Fédrigo of .

Results

External links
2008 in Road Cycling

2008
2008 UCI ProTour
2008 in French sport